Government of South Africa
Executive branch of the government of South Africa
Cabinets of South Africa
1966 establishments in South Africa
Cabinets established in 1966
Cabinets disestablished in 1966